Orthospinus franciscensis is a species of characin endemic to Brazil, where it is found in the São Francisco River basin.  It is the only member of its genus.

References
 

Characidae
Monotypic fish genera
Fish of the São Francisco River basin
Endemic fauna of Brazil
Taxa named by Carl H. Eigenmann
Fish described in 1914